is a passenger railway station  located in the town of Hokuei, Tottori Prefecture, Japan. It is operated by the West Japan Railway Company (JR West).

Lines

Station layout
The station consists of one ground-level island platform and one ground-level side platform. The station building faces the side platform, and the island platform connected by a footbridge. However, normally only platform1 is in use. The station is staffed.

Platforms

History
Yura Station opened on December 20, 1903. With the privatization of the Japan National Railways (JNR) on April 1, 1987, the station came under the aegis of the West Japan Railway Company.

Passenger statistics
In fiscal 2018, the station was used by an average of 1086 passengers daily.

Surrounding area
Hokuei Town Hall
Hokuei Town Library
Hokuei Town Tourist Information Center

See also
List of railway stations in Japan

References

External links 

 Yura Station from JR-Odekake.net 

Railway stations in Tottori Prefecture
Stations of West Japan Railway Company
Sanin Main Line
Railway stations in Japan opened in 1903
Hokuei, Tottori